Kruder & Dorfmeister, named after members Peter Kruder and Richard Dorfmeister, is an Austrian duo, known for their trip hop/downtempo remixes of pop, hip hop and drum and bass songs.

Career
In 1993, they released their first EP G-Stoned featuring the hypnotic "High Noon" and a cover resembling Simon & Garfunkel's Bookends to critical acclaim especially from the UK. Gilles Peterson played the track at first on his BBC show Worldwide.

In 2007, the duo were commissioned by Nokia to create a set of ringtones and sounds for its luxury Nokia 8800 Arte and Nokia 8800 Sapphire Arte phones.

2010 marked the 16th anniversary of Kruder & Dorfmeister and their record label G-Stone Recordings which resulted in the release of the Sixteen F**king Years Of G-Stone Recordings compilation and the development of the K&D Sessions Live show. The show included visuals by longtime G-Stone VJ collaborator Fritz Fitzke and MC performances by Earl Zinger and MC Ras T-Weed. With performances at The Big Chill, Berlin Festival and other large festivals, the K&D Sessions Live show became successful and a world tour ensued.

Discography
 1993 – G-Stoned (EP, G-Stone Recordings)
 1996 – Conversions: A K&D Selection (Spray Records/Shadow Records)
 1996 – DJ-Kicks: Kruder & Dorfmeister (Studio !K7)
 1996 – Black Baby (EP, !K7)
 1998 – The K&D Sessions (!K7)
 2002 – G-Stone Book (Label compilation)
 2008 – Shakatakadoodub (EP, G-Stone, online only)
 2010 – Sixteen F**king Years Of G-Stone Recordings (Label compilation)
 2013 – Akte Grüninger, sound by Richard Dorfmeister
 2020 – Johnson
 2020 – 1995

Aliases
Tosca (Dorfmeister with Rupert Huber)
 Discography
Peace Orchestra (Kruder)
 1999 – Peace Orchestra (G-Stone)
 2002 – Reset (G-Stone/Studio !K7)
Richard Dorfmeister vs. Madrid de los Austrias (Heinz Tronigger & Michael "Pogo" Kreiner)
 2004 – Valldemossa (Sunshine Enterprises)
 2006 – "Boogie No More" (EP, Net's Work International)
 2006 – Grand Slam (G-Stone)
 2006 – "Valldemossa Remixed" (EP, Sunshine Enterprises)
Voom:Voom (Kruder with Christian Prommer and Roland Appel)
 2000 – "Poppen / Influenza" (EP, Compost Records)
 2001 – "Ginger & Fred / Influenza Forte" (EP, Compost)
 2003 – "Baby 3" (EP, Compost)
 2006 – PengPeng (Studio !K7)

References

External links
 Kruder & Dorfmeister at Discogs
 
 Tosca – No Hassle website
 DJ-Kicks website

Austrian electronic music groups
Austrian musical duos
Electronic music duos
Trip hop groups
Austrian DJs
Downtempo musicians
Electronic dance music duos